Cathy Giancaspro (born 23 November 1970) is a Canadian gymnast. She competed in six events at the 1988 Summer Olympics.

References

External links
 

1970 births
Living people
Canadian female artistic gymnasts
Olympic gymnasts of Canada
Gymnasts at the 1988 Summer Olympics
Gymnasts from Montreal